Mariusz Daniszewski (born 16 January 1979) is a Polish rower. He competed in the men's coxless four event at the 2004 Summer Olympics.

References

External links
 

1979 births
Living people
Polish male rowers
Olympic rowers of Poland
Rowers at the 2004 Summer Olympics
People from Ełk